Pleolophus is a genus of parasitoid wasps belonging to the family Ichneumonidae.

The species of this genus are found in Europe and Northern America.

Species:
 Pleolophus annulosus Townes, 1962 
 Pleolophus astrictus Townes, 1962

References

Ichneumonidae
Ichneumonidae genera